Cathal Buí Mac Giolla Ghunna (c. 1680 – 1756) was an Irish poet.

Biography

Cathal Buí Mac Giolla Ghunna (?1680-1756) is one of the four most prominent south Ulster and north Leinster poets in the seventeenth and eighteenth centuries. He has been described as an Irish-speaking Christy Moore, an incisive ballad singing entertainer for a totally Irish-speaking community of poor people living at or below subsistence in the early 18th century. He was one of a school of ballad poetry that included Peadar Ó Doirnín, Art Mac Cumhaigh, and Séamas Dall Mac Cuarta.

Mac Giolla Ghunna was probably born in Fermanagh and, having initially studied to be a priest, settled for a career as a rake-poet. It has been remarked about his poetry that 'of the handful of poems attributed to him, most are marked by a rare humanity, but none can match An Bonnán Buí (The Yellow Bittern) with its finely-judged blend of pathos and humour'. Although "Cathal Buí", as he is still affectionately termed in the folklore of Bréifne, is now little known in Ireland, his masterpiece An Bonnán Buí is one of the best known songs in Irish. "An Bonnán Buí" was based in Lough MacNean, which is situated between Fermanagh and Cavan. A monument in his honour lies near there, which was unveiled by Cearbhall Ó Dálaigh. He is buried in Donaghmoyne, Co. Monaghan.
 
A study of the Bréifne school of poetry is forthcoming from Pádraigín Ní Uallacháin. The memory of Cathal Buí Mac Giolla Ghunna is celebrated annually in his home country – Blacklion (Cavan) and Belcoo (Fermanagh), with a festival for young poets named in his honour, Féile Chathal Buí.

References

See also
 Piaras Feiritéar
 Dáibhí Ó Bruadair
 Aogán Ó Rathaille
 Peadar Ó Doirnín
 Séamas Dall Mac Cuarta
 Art Mac Cumhaigh
 Eoghan Rua Ó Súilleabháin
 Seán Clárach Mac Dónaill

Irish poets
Irish writers
Irish-language poets
History of literature
17th-century Irish people
18th-century Irish people
1680 births
1756 deaths
People from County Fermanagh